Femina Miss India Chandigarh  is a beauty pageant in India that annually selects three winners to compete nationally. The winner of Femina Miss India Chandigarh  vies in Miss India. It is organized by Femina, a women's magazine published by Bennett, Coleman & Co. Ltd. The Times Group also conducts a stand-alone contest called Indian Diva to select a representative to Miss Universe .

Final results

Contestants

Judges
Simran Kaur Mundi – Femina Miss India Universe 2008
Vanya Mishra – Femina Miss India World 2012 
Khushwant Singh
Pooja Talwar

References

 Live Updates Pond's Femina Miss India 2013 Contest

2013 beauty pageants in India
Femina Miss India
Female models from Chandigarh